Channel 67 may refer to several television stations:

 Channel67, an internet television station

Canada
The following television stations operate on virtual channel 67 in Canada:
 CHCH-DT-3 in Muskoka, Ontario

See also
 Channel 67 virtual TV stations in the United States

67